Sajda is a Ghazal album released by HMV and jointly collaborated by Jagjit Singh and Lata Mangeshkar. This album was released in 1991 shortly after the demise of Jagjit Singh's son Vivek. This album was released as a double album consisting of 16 tracks which was released in Compact Cassette and Compact Disc form.

Ghazal tracks in Sajda 

 Dard Se Mera Daaman Bharde Ya Allah
 Kabhi Yun Bhi Aa Meri Aankh Mein
 Meri Tasveer Mein Rang Aur Kisika To Nahin
 Gham Ka Khazana Tera Bhi Hai Mera Bhi
 Kisko Qatil Main Kahoon
 Tere Jalwe Ab Mujhe
 Dhoop Mein Niklo Ghataon Mein Nahakar Dekho
 Allah Jaanta Hai
 Dhuan Banake Fiza Mein Uda Diya Mujhko
 Mili Hawaon Mein Udne Ki Woh Saza Yaaro
 Dil Mein Ab Dard-E-Mohabbat Ke Siva Kuchh Bhi Nahin
 Mausam Ko Isharon Se Bula Kyon Nahin Lete
 Tujhse Milne Ki Saza Denge
 Har Taraf Har Jagah Beshumar Aadmi
 Dil Hi Toh Hai
 Aankh Se Door Na Ho

References

Jagjit Singh albums
Ghazal albums
1991 albums